Ray Peterson (June 27, 1913 – June 14, 1999) was a player in the National Football League. He played with the Green Bay Packers during the 1937 NFL season.

References

1913 births
1999 deaths
People from Fort Bragg, California
Green Bay Packers players
San Francisco Dons football players